Salies-de-Béarn (literally Salies of Béarn) is a commune in the Pyrénées-Atlantiques department in south-western France.

The name comes from its naturally occurring saline water (Gascon salias for Standard Occitan salinas). During the expanded, pre-liberation occupation of France by Nazi Germany, Salies was on the border between the occupied zone and the free zone.

Between September 1941 and the summer of 1942, Jean Anouilh wrote his famous adaptation of Sophocles' tragedy, Antigone in the comparatively idyllic setting of Salies-de-Bearn, relieved of the invader's presence, the evening curfews and the deprivations of Paris. The play premiered in Occupied Paris in February 1944.

Salies-de-Bearn served as the setting for the writer Trevanian's novel, The Summer of Katya. In the book, it was renamed Salies-les-Bains.

Population

See also
Communes of the Pyrénées-Atlantiques department

References

 
Communes of Pyrénées-Atlantiques